Moss Eisenberg Sweedler (born 29 April 1942, in Brooklyn) is an American mathematician, known for Sweedler's Hopf algebra, Sweedler's notation, measuring coalgebras, and his proof, with Harry Prince Allen, of a conjecture of Nathan Jacobson.

Education and career
Sweedler received his Ph.D. from the Massachusetts Institute of Technology in 1965. His thesis, Commutative Hopf Algebras with Antipode, was written under the direction of thesis advisor Bertram Kostant. Sweedler wrote Hopf Algebras (1969), which became the standard reference book on Hopf algebras. He, with Harry P. Allen, used Hopf algebras to prove in 1969 a famous 25-year-old conjecture of Jacobson about the forms of generalized Witt algebras over algebraically closed fields of finite characteristic. From 1965 to the mid 1980s Sweeder worked on commutative algebra and related disciplines. Since the mid 1980s Sweedler has worked primarily on computer algebra. His research resulted in his position as director of the Army Center of Excellence for computer algebra.

Sweedler was an Invited Speaker at the International Congress of Mathematicians in 1974 in Vancouver. He was a Guggenheim Fellow for the academic year 1980–1981.

With his wife Kristin, he helped establish the Sweedler Nature Preserve.

Selected publications

with H. P. Allen: 
with Richard G. Larson: 

Groups of simple algebras, Institut des Hautes Etudes Scientifiques 44 (1975), 79–189.

with Kenneth Newman: 
with Darrell E. Halle and R. Larson: 
with I. Rubio and C. Heegard: Gröbner bases for linear recursion relations on m-D arrays and applications to decoding, Proc. IEEE Int'l Symp. on Information Theory, June 29–July 4, 1997, Ulm, Germany.
with K. Shirayanagi: Remarks on automatic algorithm stabilization, invited contribution to (fourth) IMACS Conf. on Appl. of Computer Algebra (1998).
with L. Robbiano: 
with Edward Mosteig:

References

20th-century American mathematicians
21st-century American mathematicians
Massachusetts Institute of Technology School of Science alumni
Cornell University faculty
1942 births
Living people
Algebraists